Tanya's Island is a 1980 Canadian-American fantasy film directed by Alfred Sole. It stars Denise "Vanity" Matthews (credited as “D.D. Winters”) as a young woman caught up in a love triangle with her aggressive boyfriend and a wild ape-man on an imaginary tropical island. The ape-suit was created by Rick Baker and Rob Bottin, with special effects contributions from Steve Johnson.

Plot
Tanya is a female model in Toronto who lives with her boyfriend Lobo a surrealist painter who is extremely violent. Subjected to Lobo's constant abuse, Tanya dreams of escaping to a desert island, and her dream comes true. The only other person on her island is an enormous blue-eyed man-ape who emerged from one of Lobo's paintings. Tanya befriends the beast and nicknames him "Blue." Soon she begins to feels a strange attraction to the creature, which makes Lobo increasingly jealous in the real world. He becomes determined to capture the man-ape and put it in a cage.

Cast
 Vanity as Tanya (credited as D.D. Winters)
 Richard Sargent as Lobo
 Mariette Lévesque as Kelly
 Don McLeod as Blue (credited as Don McCloud)
 Donny Burns as Blue's Voice

References

External links

 
Tanya's Island at BFI

1980 films
American erotic drama films
American fantasy films
Canadian erotic drama films
Canadian fantasy films
English-language Canadian films
1980s English-language films
Films about domestic violence
Films set on islands
Zoophilia in culture
1980s erotic drama films
1980 drama films
1980s American films
1980s Canadian films